Robert Barker was one of the two MPs for Ipswich in the English parliament of 1593.

References

Barker